Precious Is the Night is a 2020 Taiwanese-Singaporean mystery thriller drama film written and directed by Wayne Peng, and starring Chuando Tan, Nayeli, Chang Tsu-lei, Lydia Lau King-man, Chen Yixin, Xiang Yun and Tay Ping Hui. The film had its world premiere at the 57th Golden Horse Awards on November 5, 2020. It was officially released in Singapore on April 29, 2021. It received 2 nominations at the 57th Golden Horse Awards, including Best Cinematography for Wayne and Best Makeup & Costume Design for Lim Sau-hoong. It was selected as the Singaporean entry for the Best International Feature Film at the 94th Academy Awards. It will be also available for streaming on Disney+ through Hotstar in selected regions.

Synopsis
In 1960s Singapore, the story follows a 30-year-old doctor (Chuando Tan) who is caught up in a web of deception, sex and lies. The murder drama revolves around a doctor making a phone call to a mysterious and wealthy family.

Cast
Chuando Tan
Nayeli Nan
Chang Tsu-lei
Lydia Lau King-man
Chen Yixin
Xiang Yun 
Tay Ping Hui

Reception
John Lui of The Straits Times rated the film two stars out of five, writing "Visually, this movie is stunning, but one wishes this unruly mix of lust, literary allusions and lurid crime tale had a story to match." Richard Kuipers of Variety gave the film a negative review.

Awards and nominations

See also
 List of submissions to the 94th Academy Awards for Best International Feature Film
 List of Singaporean submissions for the Academy Award for Best International Feature Film

References

External links
 
 

2020s Mandarin-language films
Chinese-language Singaporean films
2020 thriller drama films
2020s mystery drama films
2020s mystery thriller films
Singaporean drama films
Taiwanese drama films
Taiwanese thriller films